Nuria Montané (born 16 January 1982) is a Spanish freestyle skier. She competed in the women's moguls event at the 2006 Winter Olympics.

References

1982 births
Living people
Spanish female freestyle skiers
Olympic freestyle skiers of Spain
Freestyle skiers at the 2006 Winter Olympics
People from La Seu d'Urgell
Sportspeople from the Province of Lleida